John Walden was a colonial administrator.

John Walden may also refer to:

John Butler Walden, Tanzanian general
John Morgan Walden, American bishop
John Walden (MP) for Middlesex (UK Parliament constituency)
 John Walden (businessman), Chief Executive of the Home Retail Group since 2014, and former Managing Director of Argos

See also